Mehmet Özgür (born 30 August 1970) is a Turkish actor. He is the general art director of the Antalya Metropolitan Municipality Theatre.

Mehmet Özgür, who graduated from the Theatre Department of Istanbul University, started career in art in 1988 with the theatre event he attended in a language course in Antalya. The following year, he focused on theater works in Antalya Halkevi. In 1993, he started working for Antalya State Theatre and made his television debut in 2004. His breakthrough came with his role as "Takoz İrfan" in the TV series Suskunlar. Afterwards, he was cast in a number of popular series, including Muhteşem Yüzyıl, Çalıkuşu, Filinta and Vuslat.

Aside from his career in cinema and television, Özgür has continued to work on stage as both an actor and a director.

Filmography 
Alparslan: Büyük Selçuklu, 2021–, "Nizam al-Mulk"
Hay Sultan, 2021, "Abdul Qadir Gilani"
Uyanış: Büyük Selçuklu, 2020–, "Nizam al-Mulk"
Jet Sosyete, 2020, "Polat Sakinoğlu" (guest appearance)
Ya İstiklal Ya Ölüm, 2020, "Mehmet Akif Ersoy"
Cinayet Süsü, 2019
Vuslat, 2019–2020, "Salih Koluber - Salih Baba"
Ölümlü Dünya, 2018, "İlhami"
Söz, 2017–2018, "Agah (Hamit Karasu)"
Masum, 2017, "Selahattin"
İçimdeki Fırtına, 2017
Hanım Köylü, 2016, "Düzgün Ağa"
125 Years Memory, 2015, "Âli Bey"
Abluka, 2015, "Kadir"
En Güzeli, 2015
Filinta, 2015, "Gıyaseddin Hatemi"
Ekisporter, 2015
Tut Sözünü , 2015, "Tokyolu"
Çalıkuşu, 2013, "Seyfettin"
Muhteşem Yüzyıl, 2013, "Lütfi Pasha"
Bana Bir Soygun Yaz, 2012, "Hacamat" 
Suskunlar, 2012, "Takoz İrfan" 
Tepenin Ardı, 2012, "Mehmet" 
Mevsim Çiçek Açtı, 2012
Hop Dedik: Deli Dumrul, 2011
Kollama, 2008–2011, "Necip Yılmaz" 
IV. Osman, 2009, "Necip Yılmaz"
Kendi Okulumuza Doğru, 2008
Sözün Bittiği Yer, 2007, "Turgut" 
Kelebek, 2007
Memleket Hikayeleri - Mican, 2006
Haylaz Babam, 2005, "Kerem" 
Çözde Al Mustafa Ali, 2005, "Mustafa Ali"
Tarçın Konuştu, 2004, "Kerem"

Theatre

As actor
Kanlı Nigar
Nalınlar
Lozan
Köşe Kapmaca
Düğün ya da Davul
The Miser
Derya Gülü
Becerikli Kanguru
Aşk Grevi
Töre
Rumuz Goncagül
Sığıntılar
Vatan Kurtaran Şaban
Fehim Paşa Konağı

As director
Sevdalı Bulut
Benim Güzel Pabuçlarım
Definename
Ali Ayşe’yi Seviyo
Boyacı
Ah Şu Gençler
Kadınlar Ih Derse

References

External links 

1970 births
Turkish male stage actors
Turkish male film actors
Turkish male television actors
Istanbul University alumni
People from Korkuteli
Living people